The 1994 International Open was a professional ranking snooker tournament that took place between 13 and 19 February 1994 at the Bournemouth International Centre in Bournemouth, England.

John Parrott won the title by defeating James Wattana 9–5 in the final. The defending champion Stephen Hendry was defeated by Alan McManus in the quarter-finals.


Main draw

References

Scottish Open (snooker)
International Open
International Open
International Open
Sport in Bournemouth